Charlotte Georgia Nast (1905-1991) was an American botanist and mycologist noted for her work as Curator of the Wood Anatomy Laboratory at Harvard University.  Nast received her PhD in Botany from the University of California, Berkeley in 1938.

Works

References 

1905 births
1991 deaths
American women scientists
American botanists
American mycologists
University of California, Berkeley alumni
20th-century American women
20th-century American people